Louise Plowright (1 June 1956 – 1 March 2016) was a British actress who trained at the Bristol Old Vic Theatre School. She first came to prominence playing abrasive hairdresser Julie Cooper in the television soap opera EastEnders from 1989 to 1990. Subsequent major roles on TV include Linda Harvey in Families and Michelle Thorn in Footballers' Wives: Extra Time.

The Cheshire-born singer-actress appeared in a number of regional and touring productions of musicals, where her roles included: April in Hot Shoe Shuffle, Julie Johnston in Bad Girls – The Musical, and, Phyllis Rogers Stone in Follies, and most recently Chitty Chitty Bang Bang amongst others. Numerous West End Concert Performances including Living On An Island at The Talk Of London. She appeared in various regional theatre pantomimes. In the summer of 2009 she appeared in Oklahoma! at the Chichester Festival Theatre as Aunt Eller, and the following autumn in Manchester in White Christmas. In 2010 she returned to the Chichester Festival Theatre to star in the revival of 42nd Street.

She made her West End theatre debut in 1999, originating the role of Tanya in the hit musical Mamma Mia!, the following year she was promoted to the leading role of Donna, which she played for four years.
On 29 October 2012, she replaced Julie Legrand as Madame Morrible in the hit musical Wicked in the West End. Due to ill health, Plowright withdrew from the production, and was replaced by Harriet Thorpe on 22 April 2013.

Death
Plowright died of pancreatic cancer on 1 March 2016, aged 59. She had raised funds for experimental treatment in Seoul, South Korea, which proved unsuccessful.

References

External links
 

British television actresses
English soap opera actresses
Alumni of Bristol Old Vic Theatre School
1956 births
2016 deaths
People from Congleton
Actors from Cheshire
English expatriates in Germany
Deaths from cancer in England
Deaths from pancreatic cancer